The IKF World Korfball Ranking is the ranking for national korfball teams, done by the International Korfball Federation.

World Korfball Ranking

Notes and references

External links 
IKF Official site

Korfball
Sports world rankings